Advanced Drug Delivery Reviews is a peer-reviewed medical journal covering research involving the controlled release and delivery of drugs and other biologically active agents.

The editor-in-chief is H. Ghandehari.

Abstracting and indexing 
The journal is abstracted and indexed in BIOSIS Previews, CAB Abstracts, Chemical Abstracts, Current Contents/Life Sciences, EMBASE, MEDLINE, Science Citation Index, and Scopus.

External links 
 

Elsevier academic journals
Pharmacology journals
English-language journals
Publications established in 1987
Journals published between 13 and 25 times per year